Dunn Loring is a census-designated place (CDP) in Fairfax County, Virginia, United States. The population was 8,803 at the 2010 census. The area borders Merrifield, Vienna, and Tysons.Dunn Loring is in the Metropolitan Area and is a suburban area next to DC. Many stars and celebrities have visited this city.

History

Dunn Loring (archaic "Dunn-Loring"), the earliest platted subdivision in Fairfax County and possibly the Commonwealth of Virginia, was founded in 1886. General William McKee Dunn and his wife Elizabeth Lanier Dunn purchased about  located on the Washington, Ohio and Western Railroad, now the Washington and Old Dominion Regional Trail, from L. B. Clarke and his wife on June 8, 1886. On September 22, 1886, the land was transferred to the Loring Land and Improvement Company, composed of General Dunn, then a retired Army brigadier general and former Judge Advocate General; George B. Loring, a former congressman and Commissioner of Agriculture; and George H. LeFetra, a Washington temperance hotel proprietor. The Town of Dunn Loring was advertised for residential sales in 1887. The Loring Land and Improvement Company built a railroad station and a post office, but shortly thereafter General Dunn died, and the development stagnated. During the Spanish–American War, the founding of Camp Russell A. Alger brought growth and prosperity to Dunn Loring, and among the troops trained at Camp Alger was the celebrated author-poet Carl Sandburg, after whom the present Sandburg Street was named. In 1912, Fairfax Shield McCandlish bought out the interests of the developers, consolidated parcels, and subdivided the land into its current platting. Following World War II, the area began to develop as part of Metropolitan Washington, D.C.

Up until the mid-1990s, large portions of the land (mainly between Lee Hwy and Gallows Rd.) had been horse farms and plantations before becoming gentrified.

Geography
Dunn Loring is located in northeastern Fairfax County at  (38.891982, −77.231150). It is bordered to the west by the town of Vienna, to the north by Tysons Corner, to the east by the Capital Beltway, and to the south by Interstate 66.

Several perennial streams of Accotink Creek's Long Branch stream run through the subdivision.

Demographics
As of the census of 2000, there were 7,861 people, 2,668 households, and 2,038 families residing in the CDP. The racial makeup of the CDP was 74.14% White, 3.00% African American, 0.29% Native American, 15.24% Asian, 0.01% Pacific Islander, 4.13% from other races, and 3.18% from two or more races. Hispanic or Latino of any race were 9.87% of the population.

There were 2,668 households, out of which 35.6% had children under the age of 18 living with them, 66.8% were married couples living together, 6.0% had a female householder with no husband present, and 23.6% were non-families. 14.9% of all households were made up of individuals, and 4.0% had someone living alone who was 65 years of age or older. The average household size was 2.90 and the average family size was 3.18.

In the CDP, the population was spread out, with 24.0% under the age of 18, 6.2% from 18 to 24, 34.1% from 25 to 44, 24.8% from 45 to 64, and 10.8% who were 65 years of age or older. The median age was 37 years. For every 100 females, there were 102.9 males. For every 100 females age 18 and over, there were 102.0 males.

Like other surrounding areas in Fairfax County, Dunn Loring is an affluent neighborhood with the median income for a household in the CDP at $204,797 (2013), and the median income for a family at $219,490 (2013). About 0.4% of families and 3.1% of the population were below the poverty line, including 0.7% of those under age 18 and 1.4% of those age 65 or over.

Transportation
Interstate 66 and Interstate 495 form the southern and eastern boundaries of Dunn Loring, respectively, and serve as the major roadways providing access to Dunn Loring.

Dunn Loring is roughly equidistant from Washington Dulles International Airport,  to the west, and Ronald Reagan Washington National Airport,  to the east. It is also served by the Dunn Loring station on the Washington Metro's Orange Line.

References 

Census-designated places in Fairfax County, Virginia
Census-designated places in Virginia
Washington metropolitan area
Populated places established in 1886
1886 establishments in Virginia